Phtheochroa vitellinana is a species of moth of the family Tortricidae. It is found in North America, where it has been recorded from Alberta, Maine, Ontario and Quebec.

Average wingspan is 12–13 mm. Adults have been recorded on wing from June to July.

References

Moths described in 1875
Phtheochroa